Jersey Zoo (formerly Durrell Wildlife Park) is a zoological park established in 1959 on the island of Jersey in the English Channel by naturalist and writer Gerald Durrell (1925–1995). It is operated by the Durrell Wildlife Conservation Trust. It has approximately 169,000 visitors per year; visitor numbers tend to vary with the tourist trade to Jersey.

Jersey Zoo has always concentrated on rare and endangered species. It has mammals, birds, amphibians and reptiles, comprising over 130 species.

Since 1964, the zoo has been home to the Durrell Wildlife Conservation Trust (formerly the Jersey Wildlife Preservation Trust).

Overview

It officially opened on 26 March 1959.

The Trust has a strong commitment to looking after the Island's native wildlife, and large areas within the grounds have been designated native habitat areas. The extensive planting of flowering and fruiting trees throughout the grounds also serves to attract a plethora of wild birds and insects. Included in the former are several species of bird which used to be commonly seen in island gardens but have become increasingly scarce, including the house sparrow and song thrush.

There are over 50 nest-boxes positioned around the grounds, which are used by a variety of birds including barn owls, kestrels, swallows and house martins. Other animals which are commonly seen within the grounds are the red squirrel, bank vole, and the short-toed treecreeper.

History

Gerald Durrell began his career capturing animals for other zoos, but thought that the facilities needed to concentrate more on animal conservation rather than mere entertainment. He started the zoo in 1959. Durrell tells the story of starting the zoo in his book "Menagerie Manor" and others.

In January 2008 plans known as "New Vision" were unveiled for the future of the zoo.  These ambitious plans had an emphasis on the notion of 'TopSpots'; places where the greatest diversity of animals are found such as islands and highlands. The plan included projects including African Bai, an environment mirroring the ecology of the African habitat that the western lowland gorillas would need to adapt to if one day it would be safe for them to be left alone in the wild; Mascarenia, to the mammals, birds and terrapins of Madagascar, Mauritius and islands of the western Indean Ocean; and eco-lodge cabins for visitors to stay in. 

It was budgeted that the cost of the redevelopment would be in the region of £46 million over the next five years. All funds needed to be raised through public and private donations. But most of the plan was eventually cancelled due to costs.

In May 2011, a new visitor centre and restaurant was officially opened by Princess Anne. Access to the zoo is not required for access to the restaurant. A webcam service has been recently developed at Durrell Wildlife Park. Cameras have been installed in the meerkat enclosure, as well as in those of the Telfair's skinks, the Livingstone's fruit bats and in the Kirindy Forest, the home of a rare and colourful bird collection. The webcam lets viewers to those species at times when they are often inaccessible, including watching the fruit bats during the evening when they are most active. In 2015 an infant silverback gorilla named Indigo who lived at the park was chosen to be the mascot of the 2015 Island Games which were held on the island.

Exhibits

Jewels of the Forest
Opened in 2004, this exhibit houses various Asian birds such as:

Palawan peacock-pheasant
Blue-crowned laughingthrush
Red-tailed laughingthrush
White-rumped shama
Nicobar pigeon
Emerald dove
Mindanao bleeding-heart dove
Java sparrow
Pekin robin
Hooded pitta
Chestnut-backed thrush
Asian fairy-bluebird
Grey-faced liocichla

Cloud Forest
Opened in 1999, the Cloud Forest is the first enclosure at Durrell to feature mixed animals, including carnivorous species.

Andean bear
Ring-tailed coati
Black howler monkey
Brazilian tanager
Orange-bellied euphonia
Red-cowled cardinal
Silver-throated tanager

Princess Royal Pavilion

The Pavilion was opened by HRH Princess Anne in the 1970s, and serves as a conference centre, and classroom. The theatre shows films depicting the work of the trust, and also exhibits artwork. It highlights the work undertaken by the Trust around the world.

The Pavilion also houses a number of species which are used for educational aspect of conservation. They include corn snakes, rainbow boas, milk snakes, New Guinea blue-tongued skinks, giant African land snails, giant millipedes, Madagascar hissing cockroaches, and Macleays spectre, a large stick insect.

The Gaherty Reptile and Amphibian Centre

The reptile house is the home of many species of reptiles and amphibians. The Gaherty Reptile and Amphibian Centre was so named because of a gift from Canadian philanthropist Geoff Gaherty.

Reptiles

Burmese python
Radiated tortoise
Galapagos giant tortoise
Flat-backed spider tortoise
Lesser Antillean iguana
Komodo dragon
Round Island skink
Spiny turtle
Panther chameleon
Rio Fuerte beaded lizard
Lesser night gecko
Martinique's anole
Serrated casquehead iguana
European adder

Amphibians

Strawberry poison-dart frog
Blue poison dart frog
Golden poison dart frog
Mountain chicken
Mission golden-eyed tree frog
Jersey agile frog

Alien Invaders

One issue which Durrell highlights is the effect of what happens when a non-native species is introduced to an environment and the damaging effect they can have. Case examples in the park include

Cane toad

Discovery Desert

The Discovery Desert was opened in April 2009, and was designed to give the family of meerkats more room to roam, and ensure they don't dig for freedom. Discovery desert is a mixed species exhibit featuring other animals which share the meerkat's habitat in the wild, and pose no threat to each other, such as the yellow mongoose.

Gorillas

The western lowland gorilla family has been represented at Durrell since it first opened in 1959, when they had only an infant female (thought to be male at first) gorilla named N'Pongo, who was later joined by a younger infant female gorilla named Nandi, and continue today to be one of the icons of the park.
The current enclosure includes a good sized outdoor play area, and three internal rooms, two large on-show ones and a smaller off-show one.
The current family of five is led by a silverback called Badongo, who was born in La Vallée des Singes. Badongo is the successor of Ya Kwanza. The remaining members of the family are female. From the Jambo era, are Kishka, and Kahilli, (Jambo x N'Pongo). There is also a young female named Bahasha. Kahilli has had two offspring from Ya Kwanza, a male named Mapema, and a female named Ya Pili. In 2007 the family suffered the loss of the youngest gorilla Ya Pili.
The other three females did not bred with Ya Kwanza.

One of the plans for the future is a new larger gorilla complex, allowing for a larger family, top rated facilities and a chance to start familiarising the species with others they would come across in the wild such as the red river hog.

Jambo

Jambo was a gorilla who was born in 1961, in the Zoo Basel, Switzerland. Jambo shot to international news stardom overnight on 31 August 1986, when five-year-old Levan Merritt fell into the gorilla enclosure and lost consciousness. Jambo stood guard over the boy when he was unconscious, placing himself between the boy and other gorillas in what ethnologists analyze as a protective gesture. He later stroked the unconscious boy. When the boy regained consciousness and started to cry, Jambo and the other gorillas retreated, and an ambulance paramedic and two keepers rescued the boy. Most of the drama was shot on home video by Brian Le Lion, and extensively photographed by other zoo visitors. The publicity on major news channels and newspapers helped the reputations of gorillas.

Red river hogs

In the past there were Red river hogs, which had been introduced to the zoo in August 2009, a transferral of two sows from Whipsnade. They had a brand new enclosure built by zoo volunteers, with a viewing platform in which to view them. The aim of the Trust was to highlight the issue of the illegal trade of bushmeat in Africa, which also affects other species such as gorillas. A breeding programme was started in 2011 with the arrival of the boar hog. However, there are no longer any hogs at the zoo.

Tamarins and marmosets

The tamarins are kept in two areas of the park, some such as the golden lion and emperor tamarins are best kept within their own enclosures. Meanwhile, others such as the black lion tamarin and the silvery marmoset are allowed to run free in a small wooded area which helps them thrive.

 Silvery marmoset
 Goeldi's monkey
 Golden lion tamarin
 Golden-headed lion tamarin
 Emperor tamarin
 Black lion tamarin
 Pied tamarin

Central Valley

The Central Valley, expands across the centre of the park, creating a natural barrier and water resource for local species. A£1 million project to redevelop the central valley, completed in 2002, has created a haven for kingfishers, bank voles, butterflies, dragonflies, and several species of waterfowl. During the valley restoration two species of locally rare orchid were encouraged, and first flowered in 2005. They are Anacamptis laxiflora and Dactylorhiza praetermissa.

Oriental small-clawed otter
Red-breasted goose
Chilean flamingo
Grey crowned crane
Swan goose
White-naped crane
Blue crane
Red-billed chough
The red-billed chough became extinct on Jersey in the nineteenth century, but they have once again returned. Durrell has joined a breeding programme and so a group are being kept at Durrell to form a captive colony, with hope to establish a free flying colony in the Trust's grounds.

Aviaries

Dotted around the Central Valley are a number of aviaries which house a selection of birds from different parts of the world. The aviaries are specialised to reflect habitat the birds should become adapted to should they be released back into the wild. They are large enough for them to fly short distances, or search the ground for food.

Northern bald ibis
Congo peafowl
Edward's pheasant
Vietnamese pheasant
Red-crested turaco
St. Lucia amazon
Bali starling
Pink pigeon
Echo parakeet
Black bulbul
Montserrat oriole
Wrinkled hornbill
White-crowned robin-chat
Indonesian teal
Tropical mockingbird

Orangutans and gibbons

In an enclosure which was revamped in the 1990s the orang utans have a large outdoor play area for them to swing around. The enclosure consists of one large main house, with two extensive external islands surrounded by a moat.
The orangutan family have been in Durrell since 1968, and come from Sumatra. Durrell used to have the Bornean orangutans, until it was decided that Durrell should focus on the rarest when the redevelopment took place. There are currently five orangutans at Durell; The dominant male is called Dagu. The adult females are, Annette and Dana. The two offspring are Mawar (who moved to Prague Zoo with her son Gempa in 2011)'s eldest son Jiwa and Annette's son Jantho.
Sharing the island play areas is a female lar gibbon named Hazel.

Sumatran orangutan
Lar gibbon

Macaques

Since 1964 Durrell have been working with the macaque family, in the same location, just to the side of the valley. The family have bred well, though events in Sulawesi counterbalance the work in Durrell.

Celebes crested macaque

Teal Aviary

Madagascar teal
Meller's duck
Marbled duck
Ferruginous duck
Blue-billed teal

Lemurs

Durrell is the home to six species of lemur. Five species (excluding the red-fronted brown lemurs which are solely in Kirindy Forest) are dotted around the grounds and some form the vocal point of the Madagascan exhibit Kirindy Forest.

 Ring-tailed lemur
 Black-and-white ruffed lemur
 Red ruffed lemur
 Alaotran gentle lemur
 Aye-aye
 Red-fronted brown lemur

Bat tunnel

A large polytunnel was built with used tyres in spring 2011. It is the new home of two species of bat. An additional tunnel was completed in summer 2017. It was also built using recycled materials and will provide more room for the bats to fly, in particular creating a circular flying pattern.

 Rodrigues flying fox
 Livingstone's fruit bat

Kirindy Forest

A major renovation project was to transform the Walled Gardens into an area marked Kirindy Forest. Based on the dry forests of Madagascar, the area is designed to showcase the work being done with the native species. There are new homes for the aye-ayes, giant jumping rats and mongooses, and a new walkthrough aviary.

Ring-tailed lemur
Red-fronted brown lemur
Aye-aye
Narrow-striped mongoose
Malagasy giant rat
Madagascar teal
Black-winged stilt
White-backed duck
White-faced whistling duck
African pygmy goose
Madagascar turtle dove
Madagascar crested ibis
Red fody
Hammerkop

Conservation successes
Proof that conservation does work, some species have returned home for continuation of programmes to reintroduce them to their own environment

Mauritius kestrel
In 1976 there were only four individuals in the wild with one female. Durrell took the risk of taking a recent clutch of eggs and had them hatched successfully – rebuilding the species, almost from scratch. The conservation for the species has moved on to the next stage and its focus has returned to Mauritius, re-establishing the species in the community and ecosystem.

Przewalski's horse
With the newly established wild population of these species, originally extinct from the wild the zoo was part of the coalition of 'zoos' which together brought the species from the brink of extinction.

Work in Jersey

Helping the local species
Durrell is working closely with local wildlife groups to help with the declining populations of Jersey's sand lizard, the Jersey crapaud / common toad, and Jersey's agile frog.

Local rare and declining plant propagation
The aim is maintain the genetic diversity of the locally rare plants.
Currently four species are being grown in the propagation unit. Fragaria vesca (wild strawberry), Dianthus gallicus (Jersey pink), Anogramma leptophylla (Jersey fern) and Linaria vulgaris (common toadflax).
Other plant species will be propagated as seed or cutting material becomes available. As some of these plant species are severely threatened, finding specimens for propagation will be a challenge.

Bird reintroductions
In 2010 Durrell undertook a project to reintroduce birds that once populated the island's clifftops, but have long disappeared. The red-billed chough is the first focus of the programme, and they can now be found in the central valley area. There are also plans to do something similar with the yellowhammer should the project prove successful.

Durrell overseas
Pygmy hog
Although no longer located in Jersey, conservation is still monitored by Durrell in Assam, India and other locations. The species is still in dire need of funding and help. During 2008 some pygmy hogs were released into the wild in Assam, early reports show good progress with the species
Blue iguana
Hitting headlines recently is some success in Grand Cayman with the blue iguana. Working alongside local authorities the iguana is being saved from extinction. It shows what can be done. In 2008 the project suffered a drawback when intruders broke into the complex and killed numerous iguanas, including juveniles and expecting females.
Madagascar pochard
Previously thought extinct, (found when looking for something else), Durrell have recently teamed up with Madagascar to help research and study the species. With scouts unable to locate more individuals, it has become a possibility that experts will have to bring the survivors back to Jersey, using expertise from the Madagascar teal and Meller's duck to help the duck get back from the brink.
Antiguan racer
In 1995 it was dubbed the world's rarest snake. More recently the species have been relocated back to Antigua on some islands where they are free from predators and pests.
Mauritius olive white-eye
White-footed tamarin
Ploughshare tortoise
Round Island day gecko
Round Island skink
Round Island boa
Mangrove finch
Mauritius fody
Giant hispaniolan galliwasp
Cuban solenodon
Floreana mockingbird
Hispaniolan hutia
Hispaniolan solenodon
Mountain coati

Completed programmes 
Partula snails
Rhinoceros iguana 1974–2010
African crested porcupine
White-headed marmoset
Cuvier's dwarf caiman
Cottontop tamarin 1972–2009
Parma wallaby 1959–2008
Trinidad stream frog
Green and black poison dart frog
Standing's day gecko
Plumed basilisk
Snow leopard
Cheetah
Babirusa
Snowy owl
White-eared pheasant
Bornean orangutan
Serval
Volcano rabbit
Chimpanzee
African lion
Brazilian tapir
Leopards
Peccaries
Macaws
Porcupines
Humboldt penguin

Durrell Wildlife Camp
Work began on the Durrell Wildlife Camp in early 2012, which will allow the park to sell lodging and services to visitors.

A wooded copse to the west of Les Augrès Manor has been landscaped to provide a nine-metre-square level wooden deck roughly every seven metres. These decks will house twelve geodesic dome-shaped, semi permanent tent structures and a separate shower and toilet cubicle for each. A further two platforms will house a communal structure and a pod for health and beauty treatments.

Durrell Wildlife Camp is described as a 'glamorous camping' resort. The site has WiFi coverage, and each pod has a hard-wired electrical feed for running AC 240 V appliances.

References

External links 

Zoos in Jersey
Trinity, Jersey
Zoos established in 1959